Marie Joseph Demers (May 31, 1871 – July 28, 1940) was a Canadian politician.

Born in St-Georges d'Henryville, Quebec, the son of Alexis-Louis Demers, former M.L.A. for Iberville, and the brother of Louis Philippe Demers, who sat in the House of Commons of Canada from 1900 to 1906 until he was appointed a Puisne Judge, Superior Court. Demers was educated at the College of St. Hyacinthe and St. Mary's College, Montreal. A lawyer, he practised in DeLorimier, near Montreal. He was elected to the House of Commons for St. Johns—Iberville in the by-election called after his brother was appointed a judge. A Liberal, he was re-elected in 1908, 1911, 1917, and 1921. He resigned in 1922, when he accepted of an office of emolument under the Crown.

References
 The Canadian Parliament; biographical sketches and photo-engravures of the senators and members of the House of Commons of Canada. Being the tenth Parliament, elected November 3, 1904

External links
 

1871 births
1940 deaths
Liberal Party of Canada MPs
Members of the House of Commons of Canada from Quebec
People from Montérégie